Never trust a guy who after having been a punk, is now playing electro is the eighth album by the French rock band Les Wampas, released in 2003.

Track listing
 Le télégramme de Brest  – 3:37
 Manu Chao (song)  – 2:49
 Comme un Kényan  – 3:49
 Je t'ai donné ma vie  – 3:05
 Little Daewoo  – 3:38
 Toulouse  – 2:49
 C.R.S.  – 2:58
 Vol à voile  – 3:12
 Le vélo violet  – 2:25
 Chocorêve  – 3:40
 Giscard complice  – 2:05
 Les apprentis charcutiers  – 3:40
 Country en Croatie  – 1:48
 L'aquarium tactile  – 2:38
 Liste de droite  – 3:20

Personnel
 Didier Wampas (vocals)
 Philippe Almosnino (guitar)
 Joseph Dahan (guitar)
 Jean-Michel Lejoux (bass)
 Nicolas Shauer (drums)

Singles
The track "Manu Chao" was the only single from this album, with the track listing:
"Manu Chao"
"CGT"
"Manu Chao" (music video)

2003 albums
Les Wampas albums